Bettina Ustrowski (born 27 July 1976) is a German former swimmer, born in Berlin, who competed in the 1992 Summer Olympics.

References

1976 births
Living people
Swimmers from Berlin
German female swimmers
Female butterfly swimmers
Olympic swimmers of Germany
Swimmers at the 1992 Summer Olympics
Olympic silver medalists for Germany
European Aquatics Championships medalists in swimming
Medalists at the 1992 Summer Olympics
Olympic silver medalists in swimming